Alexander Bittroff (born 19 September 1989) is a German professional footballer who plays as a full-back for 1. FC Magdeburg.

References

External links

1989 births
Living people
People from Lauchhammer
People from Bezirk Cottbus
German footballers
Footballers from Brandenburg
Association football fullbacks
2. Bundesliga players
3. Liga players
Regionalliga players
FC Energie Cottbus II players
FC Energie Cottbus players
FSV Frankfurt players
Chemnitzer FC players
KFC Uerdingen 05 players
1. FC Magdeburg players